DSV Concordia is a multi sport club in Delft that has been operating since 1885 and introduced Jan Thomée to the world when he became the leading football goal scorer for the Netherlands and played in the 1908 Summer Olympics as part of the Dutch team that took the Football Bronze.

Current sports
Cricket, Football, Golf and Tennis are the four official sports played in the club.

Trivia
The club "yell" is intricately connected to one of the most famous Concordians who was a chairman of the club for 18 years.

References

Cricket teams in the Netherlands
Football clubs in the Netherlands
Golf clubs and courses in the Netherlands
Tennis in the Netherlands
Sports clubs established in 1885
Multi-sport clubs in the Netherlands
Football clubs in Delft